Andriesh is a 1954 Soviet film directed by Yakov Bazelyan and Sergei Parajanov.

Plot 
The tale of the young shepherd Andriesh, who dreamed of becoming a knight, the magic flute that the hero Vainov gave him, and the fight against the evil wizard Black Whirlwind, who hates everything living.

Cast
 Giuli Chokhonelidze 
  Konstantin Russu 
  Nodar Shashigoglu 
  Ludmila Sokolova 
  Domnika Dariyenko 
  Robert Klyavin 
  Trifon Gruzin
 Nodar Şaşıqoğlu

References

External links 
 

1954 films
1950s Russian-language films
Films directed by Sergei Parajanov
Soviet black-and-white films
Dovzhenko Film Studios films
Russian children's films
Films based on children's books
1954 directorial debut films
1950s children's films
Russian black-and-white films
Soviet children's films